Tillman Davis Johnson (January 8, 1858 – November 1, 1953) was a United States district judge of the United States District Court for the District of Utah.

Education and career

Born in Rutherford County, Tennessee, Johnson attended Cumberland University and read law to enter the bar. He was a teacher in Tennessee from 1880 to 1885, and was principal of the Government Indian School in Fort Bennett, Dakota Territory (now South Dakota) from 1886 to 1887, and of the Government Indian School in Fort Hall, Idaho Territory (now Idaho) from 1888 to 1889. He was in private practice in Ogden, Utah Territory (State of Utah from January 4, 1896) from 1889 to 1915. He was a member of the Utah House of Representatives from 1898 to 1899. In 1912, he ran for United States Congress as a Democrat.

Federal judicial service

Johnson received a recess appointment from President Woodrow Wilson on November 2, 1915, to a seat on the United States District Court for the District of Utah vacated by Judge John Augustine Marshall. He was nominated to the same position by President Wilson on January 7, 1916. He was confirmed by the United States Senate on January 18, 1916, and received his commission the same day. He assumed senior status on May 28, 1949. His service terminated on November 1, 1953, due to his death in Ogden.

Attempted assassination

On September 30, 1927 Johnson was shot three times while mounting the bench in Salt Lake City, Utah. The assailant, Eliza Simmons was angry at Johnson for ruling against her in a case decided in 1924 involving the death of her husband in a 1910 mining accident. Johnson was not seriously injured, only suffering flesh wounds to his lower body. Convicted of attempted murder in November 1927, Simmons was sentenced to seven years in prison.

References

Sources
 

1858 births
1953 deaths
People from Ogden, Utah
Members of the Utah House of Representatives
Judges of the United States District Court for the District of Utah
United States district court judges appointed by Woodrow Wilson
20th-century American judges
Cumberland University alumni
United States federal judges admitted to the practice of law by reading law
American shooting survivors